Stasina is a genus of huntsman spiders that was first described by Eugène Louis Simon in 1877. Many former species have been transferred to Thelcticopis and Neostasina.

Species
 it contains nine species, found in Asia, Venezuela, Brazil, Gabon, and on the Greater Antilles:
Stasina americana Simon, 1887 – Brazil
Stasina hirticeps Caporiacco, 1955 – Venezuela
Stasina manicata Simon, 1897 – Gabon
Stasina nalandica Karsch, 1892 – Sri Lanka
Stasina paripes (Karsch, 1879) – Sri Lanka
Stasina planithorax Simon, 1897 – Malaysia
Stasina rangelensis Franganillo, 1935 – Cuba
Stasina spinosa Simon, 1897 – Brazil
Stasina vittata Simon, 1877 (type) – Philippines

See also
 List of Sparassidae species

References

Araneomorphae genera
Sparassidae
Spiders of Asia
Spiders of South America
Spiders of the Caribbean